Amaral's ground snake (Caaeteboia amarali) is a species of snake in the family Colubridae. The species is endemic to Brazil.

Etymology
The specific name, amarali, is in honor of Brazilian herpetologist Afrânio Pompílio Gastos do Amaral.

Geographic range
C. amarali is found in eastern Brazil, in the Brazilian states of Bahia, Espírito Santo, Minas Gerais, Paraná, Rio de Janeiro, and Santa Catarina.

Description
C. amarali is a small-sized, aglyphous, slender snake with a moderately long tail.

Behavior
C. amarali is diurnal, partly arboreal, and exhibits dorsal flattening and cloacal evacuation as defensive behaviors (Marques et al. 2001).

Diet
The diet of C. amarali consists of frogs and lizards.

Reproduction
C. amarali is oviparous.

References

Further reading
Freiberg M (1982). Snakes of South America. Hong Kong: T.F.H. Publications. 189 pp. . (Liophis amarali, p. 102).
Marques OAV, Eterovic A, Sazima I (2001). Serpentes da Mata Atlântica: Guia Ilustrado para a Serra do Mar. Ribeirão Preto, São Paulo, Brazil: Holos Editora. 184 pp. (in Portuguese).
Wettstein O (1930). "Eine neue colubridae Schlange aus Brasilien ". Zoologischer Anzeiger 88: 93–94. (Liophis amarali, new species). (in German).
Zaher H, Grazzziotin FG, Cadle JE, Murphy RW, Moura-Leite JC, Bonatto SL (2009). "Molecular phylogeny of advanced snakes (Serpentes, Caenophidia) with an emphasis on South American Xenodontines: a revised classification and descriptions of new taxa". Papéis Avulsos de Zoologia, Museu de Zoologia da Universidade de São Paulo 49 (11): 115–153. (Caaeteboia amarali, new combination, p. 144). (in English, with an abstract in Portuguese).

Caaeteboia
Snakes of South America
Reptiles of Brazil
Endemic fauna of Brazil
Reptiles described in 1930
Taxa named by Otto von Wettstein